SM City Cabanatuan is a shopping mall owned by SM Prime Holdings with a gross floor area of . It is the second SM Supermall in Cabanatuan after SM Megacenter Cabanatuan. It is located along Brgy. Hermogenes Concepcion, Cabanatuan, Nueva Ecija, Philippines.

It is the second largest SM mall in Central Luzon, following SM City Clark. When it opened in 2015, it was dubbed the largest mall in North Luzon outside of Metro Manila, until being recently dethroned due to the expansion of SM City Baguio and SM City Clark.

Location 
SM City Cabanatuan is located along Maharlika Highway (also known as Pan-Philippine Highway), Barangay Hermogenes Concepcion, Cabanatuan. The mall is also adjacent to a portion of the 12.35-kilometer Emilio Vergara Highway.

Planning
After a 10-year negotiation in 2012, The SM Group pushed the plan to build a new mall in Cabanatuan. The SM Group has been eyeing to set up SM City Cabanatuan since 2002, but the negotiations within the city government said it was reportedly due to stiff opposition from other local mall operators. SM Prime Executive Vice President Jeffrey Lim denied there was any opposition to the development in Cabanatuan. The SM Group eventually transferred the mall site to a 8.5-hectare commercial site along the National Highway in Barangay Hermogenes Concepcion, which became available in 2009, according to the company executive.

The construction of SM City Cabanatuan was planned to begin in 2012, but it only commenced around 2013. The mall then finally opened to the public on October 9, 2015.

Features
The mall anchors The SM Store, SM Supermarket, Ace Hardware, SM Appliance Center, Watson's, The Body Shop, Uniqlo, and other major anchors. The mall features six state-of-the-art cinemas with a seating capacity of 1,807, including a large format theater (which is the Cinema 4) capable for 3D movies, and a stadium type seating similar to IMAX that houses up to 507 guests.

On 2017, the mall installed solar panels on rooftops similar to SM City North EDSA and SM Mall of Asia with a power of 8.9 megawatts (MW) total capacity along with SM City Cauayan and SM City Iloilo.

Sky Garden and Roof Park 
SM City Cabanatuan includes two Sky Gardens – the Garden Park, which provides covered shelter; and the Roof Park located at the fourth level. The Garden Park is a long, elevated garden park which opened the same day as the mall's grand opening. The Roof Park features an indoor fountain, open playgrounds, pet areas, and mall tenants as well.

Gallery

See also
SM City Clark
SM City Pampanga
SM Supermalls

References

Shopping malls in the Philippines
SM Prime
Buildings and structures in Cabanatuan
Shopping malls established in 2015
Shopping malls in Nueva Ecija